The 2004 Baltimore Orioles season involved the Orioles finishing 3rd in the American League East with a record of 78 wins and 84 losses. The team led Major League Baseball in at bats (5,736) and hits (1,614).

Offseason
December 3, 2003: Bill Haselman was signed as a free agent with the Baltimore Orioles.
February 5, 2004: Clay Bellinger was signed as a free agent with the Baltimore Orioles.
March 15, 2004: B.J. Surhoff was signed as a free agent with the Baltimore Orioles.

Regular season

Season standings

Record vs. opponents

Notable transactions
July 6, 2004: Ken Huckaby was selected off waivers by the Baltimore Orioles from the Texas Rangers.

Roster

Player stats

Batting

Starters by position
Note: Pos = Position; G = Games played; AB = At bats; H = Hits; Avg. = Batting average; HR = Home runs; RBI = Runs batted in

Other batters
Note: G = Games played; AB = At bats; H = Hits; Avg. = Batting average; HR = Home runs; RBI = Runs batted in

Starting pitchers 
Note: G = Games pitched; IP = Innings pitched; W = Wins; L = Losses; ERA = Earned run average; SO = Strikeouts

Other pitchers 
Note: G = Games pitched; IP = Innings pitched; W = Wins; L = Losses; ERA = Earned run average; SO = Strikeouts

Relief pitchers 
Note: G = Games pitched; W = Wins; L = Losses; SV = Saves; ERA = Earned run average; SO = Strikeouts

Farm system

References

2004 Baltimore Orioles team at Baseball-Reference
2004 Baltimore Orioles season at baseball-almanac.com

Baltimore Orioles seasons
Baltimore
Baltimore Orioles